Zombitopia ( known as Zombietopia) is a 2021 Malaysian Malay-language apocalyptic horror thriller film directed by Woo Ming Jin along written by himself with Neesa Jamal, starring Shaheizy Sam, Elvina Mohamad, Bront Palarae, Azman Hassan and Sharifah Amani. The film revolves around a mysterious virus that causes infected humans to act violently, causing a zombie apocalypse. 

With the film being licensed with Skop Productions, the film was originally scheduled for released on 13 February 2020 but postponed due to the coronavirus pandemic. However, the film released exclusively on Disney+ Hotstar on 2 July 2021.

Cast 

 Shaheizy Sam as Zidik
 Elvina Mohamad as Zooey
 Bront Palarae as Dr. Rahman
 Nur Shahidah as Siti
 Azman Hassan as Hassan
 Sharifah Amani as Maya
 Idan Aedan as Zidik kecil
 Amanda Amry as Zooey kecil
 Ruzana Ibrahim as Kak Lily
 Eqy Afandi as Jamal
 Kazar Razak as Mika
 Nu'Man Salleh as Bob
 Jay Iswazir as Kamarul
 Ken Abdullah as Bentong Khan
 Michael Leong Chee Wah as Yuri
 Steve Yap as Lee Boon Kit
 Dania Erisha as Kiki
 Danny Low as Mustapha

Release 
This film was initially scheduled for release in the local cinemas on 13 February 2020, which is one month before the COVID-19 pandemic begin in the country, but postponed then until the new date announced. Over a year later, the film was released with the exclusive premiere as Hotstar Originals on Disney+ Hotstar on 2 July 2021. An official trailer of the film spotted on Skop Productions YouTube channel on 21 January 2020 and on Disney+ Hotstar Malaysia YouTube channel on 4 May 2021.

References

External links 

 
 Zombitopia on Disney+ Hotstar

2021 films
2021 horror thriller films
Malaysian horror thriller films
Films postponed due to the COVID-19 pandemic
Malaysian zombie films
Films about viral outbreaks
Malay-language films